The Kaniv Reservoir is a water reservoir located on the Dnieper River in Ukraine. Named after the city of Kaniv, it covers a total area of 675 square kilometers within the Cherkasy and Kyiv Oblasts. It was created in 1972 following construction of the dams of the Kaniv Hydroelectric Power Plant on the Dnieper River. Along with the Kakhovka Reservoir, the Dnipro Reservoir, the Kamianske Reservoir, the Kremenchuk Reservoir, and the Kyiv Reservoir, it has created a deep-water route on the Dnieper, allowing ships to sail upstream as far as the Prypiat River.

The reservoir is 162 km long, up to 5 km wide, and has an average depth of 5.5 meters. The total water volume is 2.6 km³.

References

Reservoirs built in the Soviet Union
Reservoirs in Ukraine
Reservoirs of the Dnieper